The Maryland Million Ladies Stakes is an American Thoroughbred horse race held annually in October since 1986 primarily at Laurel Park Racecourse in Laurel, Maryland or at Pimlico Race Course in Baltimore. To be eligible for the Maryland Million Ladies, a 3 year-old filly must be sired by a stallion who stands in Maryland. Due to that restriction the race is classified as a non-graded or "listed" stakes race and is not eligible for grading by the American Graded Stakes Committee.

The race is part of Maryland Million Day, a 12-race program held in mid October that was the creation of renowned television sports journalist Jim McKay. The "Maryland Million" is the first State-Bred showcase event ever created. Since 1986, 27 other events in 20 states have imitated the showcase and its structure.

At its inception in 1986 through 1990 the Maryland Million Ladies was run at one and 1/16 mile on turf. The race was run on the main track on dirt in 1992 and 1995. From 1991 to present (with the above exceptions) the race has been run at  miles on the turf. 
 
In its 30th running in 2015, the race is restricted to those horses who were sired by a stallion who stands in the state of Maryland. Both the entrant horse and their stallion must be nominated to the Maryland Million program.

The race itself has had many titles since 1986 due in large part to the aggressive marketing efforts of Maryland Million Limited, the series corporate founder. In its inaugural year (1986) the race was called the "Eskimo Pie Maryland Ladies." From 1987 through 1992 the race was known as the "First National Bank of Maryland Ladies." In 1993 the race was called the "BWI Airport Maryland Ladies" and in 1994-1995 the "USAir Maryland Ladies." From 1997 through 1999 the race was known as the "Carrollton Bank Maryland Ladies and from 2000-2001 it was called the "Kameen Laser Eye Associates Maryland Ladies." In 2004 the race was called the "Susquehanna Bank Maryland Ladies."

Records 

Most wins horse:  
 3 - Mz. Zill Bear (1993, 1994, 1995)
 3 - Countus In (1989, 1990, 1991)

Speed record: 
 9 furlongs: 1:46.86 - Hail Hillary (2003)
 8.5 furlongs: 1:42 1/5 - Countus In (1989)

Most wins by a jockey:
 3 - Julie Krone
 3 - Jeremy Rose

Most wins by a trainer:
 4 - Dale Capuano (2000, 2001, 2013, 2015)

Most wins by an owner:
 3 - Mea Culpa Stables
 3 - Charles G. Middleton III

Winners

See also
 Maryland Million Ladies top three finishers
 Maryland Million Day
 Laurel Park Racecourse

References

 Maryland Thoroughbred official website

Horse races in Maryland
Laurel Park Racecourse
Recurring sporting events established in 1986
1986 establishments in Maryland